Pete Camarata  (born September 7, 1946, in Detroit, Michigan) was a Teamster labor activist and one of the founders of Teamsters for a Democratic Union a rank-and-file union democracy movement organizing to reform the International Brotherhood of Teamsters (IBT), or Teamsters.

Early Years
Pete was born in Detroit, Michigan the auto capital of the world. Pete was the son of a United Auto Workers organizer, Caspar Camarata who worked for Packard Motor Car Company.

Teamster Activism
At the young age of 29, Pete was the solo TDU affiliated delegate to the 1976 Teamster convention, where he spoke out against the International Brotherhood of Teamsters leadership. He was later beaten unconscious for his opposition.

References 

 

International Brotherhood of Teamsters people
1946 births
2014 deaths